Symphony No. 3 in E-flat Major may refer to:

 Symphony No. 3 (Beethoven) the Eroica
 Symphony No. 3 (Dvořák)
 Symphony No. 3 (Schumann), Opus 97, the Rhenish symphony
 Symphony No. 3 (Shostakovich), Opus 20, The First of May
 Symphony in E-flat major, Op. 11, No. 3 (Stamitz)
 Symphony No. 3 (Mozart) now considered to be the work of Carl Friedrich Abel, being his Symphony No. 6
 Symphony No. 3 in E flat major, Opus 4, WK 9, by Carl Friedrich Abel
 Symphony No. 3, op. 90 (1813) by  Ferdinand Ries
 Symphony No. 3, Op. 14 (by 1809) by Johann Wilhelm Wilms

See also
 List of symphonies in E-flat major

Compositions in E-flat major